Family Kr (also known as Family 35) is a large group of the New Testament manuscripts. It belongs to the Byzantine text-type as one of the textual families of this group. The group contains no uncial manuscripts, but is represented by a substantial number of minuscules.

Description 
The group was discovered by Hermann von Soden in the late 19th century and designated by him with symbol Kr. According to Soden, the group is the result of an early 12th century attempt to create a unified New Testament text; the copying was controlled and the accuracy is unequalled in the history of the transmission of the New Testament text. Text Kr gained in popularity and became the most copied Greek text of the late Middle Ages. On the basis of the present location of most of the members of the group, it appears to have originated in the area of Constantinople or Mount Athos.

Majority of manuscript can be recognized by the distinctive marginal lectionary equipment which are different from the traditional Eusebian Canons. Von Soden used this markings to identify Kr members. The text of the group is also distinct and easy to identify.

One characteristic of these manuscripts is that the story of Jesus and the woman taken in adultery (John 7:53–8:11) is marked with obeli. Maurice Robinson argues that these marks do not represent a textual judgment, but are intended as a reminder that these verses are to be omitted when reading the Gospel for Pentecost (John 7:37–8:12).

David O. Voss confirmed the distinctiveness of the Kr group. He enumerated some readings typical for this group.  Wilbur Pickering generated a New Testament reading based on the F35 family of manuscripts.

Wisse's group readings in Luke 1, 10, and 20 

The word before the bracket is the reading of the UBS edition; the readings which are not bold are those of the Textus Receptus.

 Luke 1:44 — εν αγαλλιασει το βρεφος ] το βρεφος εν αγαλλιασει
 Luke 1:55 — εις τον αιωνα ] εως αιωνος
 Luke 1:63 — εστι(ν) ] εσται
 Luke 10:4 — μη ] μηδε
 Luke 10:12 — λεγω ] + δε
 Luke 10:36 — πλησιον δοκει σοι ] δοκει σοι πλησιον
 Luke 10:39 — τον λογον ] των λογων
 Luke 10:41 — ειπεν αυτη ο κυριος (or Ιησους) ] ο κυριος ειπεν αυτη
 Luke 20:1 — αρχιερεις ] ιερεις
 Luke 20:5 — δια τι ] + ουν
 Luke 20:9 — τις ] οmit
 Luke 20:15 — αυτον ] οmit
 Luke 20:19 — τον λαον ] οmit
 Luke 20:28 — Μωυσης ] Μωσης
 Luke 20:31 — επτα ] + και
 Luke 20:34 — γαμιζονται ] εγκαμιζονται (ΤR reads: εγκαμισκονται)
 Luke 20:37 — Μωυσης ] Μωσης.

Members of the family 

Wisse enumerated 221 manuscripts of this family:
18, 35, 47, 55, 56, 58, 66, 83, 128, 141, 147, 155, 167, 170, 182, 189, 201, 204, 214, 246, 285, 290, 361, 363, 386, 387, 394, 402, 479, 480, 483 (Luke corrector), 510, 511, 512, 516, 521, 547, 553, 558, 575, 586, 588, 594, 645, 660, 664, 673, 685, 689, 691, 694, 696, 757, 758, 763, 769, 781, 786, 789, 797, 802, 806, 824, 825, 845, 867, 897, 928, 932, 938, 940, 952, 953, 955, 959, 960, 962, 966, 973, 975, 1003, 1020, 1023, 1025, 1030, 1046, 1059, 1062, 1072, 1075, 1082, 1092, 1095, 1111, 1116, 1145, 1156, 1147, 1158, 1165, 1169, 1176, 1185, 1189, 1190, 1199, 1224, 1234, 1236, 1247, 1250, 1251, 1276, 1323, 1328, 1329, 1334, 1339, 1348, 1389, 1400, 1401, 1409, 1435, 1445, 1453, 1461, 1462, 1471, 1476, 1480, 1482, 1487, 1488, 1489, 1492, 1493, 1496, 1499, 1501, 1503, 1508, 1517, 1543, 1544, 1548, 1551, 1552, 1559, 1560, 1572, 1576, 1584, 1596, 1599, 1600, 1601, 1614, 1617, 1619, 1621, 1622, 1625, 1628, 1633, 1634, 1636, 1637, 1638, 1648, 1649, 1650, 1656, 1658, 1659, 1664, 1667, 1686, 1694, 1698, 1699, 1703, 1713, 1813, 2122, 2135, 2204, 2221, 2260, 2261, 2273, 2284, 2296, 3222, 2323, 2355, 2364, 2367, 2370, 2382, 2399, 2407, 2452, 2454, 2460, 2466, 2483, 2496, 2503, 2520, 2554, 2621, 2635, 2673, 2689, 2692, 2709, 2765, 2767.

See also 

 Family E
 Family Π
 Family K1
 Family Kx
 Family 1424

References

Further reading 

 Hermann von Soden, Die Schriften des Neuen Testaments, in ihrer ältesten erreichbaren Textgestalt hergestellt auf Grund ihrer Textgeschichte, Verlag von Arthur Glaue, Berlin 1902-1910, pp. 757–765, 799-805.
 David Ole Voss, Is von Soden's Kr a distinct type of Text? JBL 57 (1938), pp. 311–318.
 Georgi Parpulov, 'Kr in the Gospels', in The New Testament in Antiquity and Byzantium: Traditional and Digital Approaches to its Texts and Editing, ed. H.A.G. Houghton, David Parker, Holger Strutwolf, Berlin and New York 2019, pp. 203-213

External links 
 Text-Types and Textual Kinship at the Encyclopedia of Textual Criticism

Greek New Testament manuscripts